Targa or TARGA may refer to:

Car racing events
Targa Adelaide, in Australia
Targa Canada West, in British Columbia
Targa Florio, in Sicily, Italy, 1906–1977
Targa Florio Rally, in Sicily, Italy, from 1978
Targa High Country, in Victoria, Australia
Targa New Zealand
Targa Newfoundland, in Canada
Targa Rignano, in Italy, 1902–1904
Targa Tasmania, Australia
Targa West, in Western Australia
 Targa Wrest Point, in Tasmania, Australia

Places
 Targa, Kasur, Pakistan
 Targa, Sialkot, Pakistan
 Targa, Tasmania, Australia
Tarġa Battery, in Malta

Other uses
 Targa top, or targa, a car body style
Targa, versions of the Porsche 911
 Targa, a range of boats made by Fairline
 Targa, a range of boats used by the Metropolitan Police Marine Policing Unit
 Targa, unreleased version of video game Rendering Ranger: R2
 Targa, a pen by Sheaffer
 Truevision TGA, or TARGA, an image file format
 UP Targa, a German paraglider design

See also

 Targe, a general word for shield in late Old English
 Targa Resources, an American company
Targa timing system, a system of timing used in car rallying